Franklin Township is one of thirteen townships in Washington County, Indiana, United States. As of the 2010 census, its population was 2,301 and it contained 874 housing units.

Geography

Unincorporated towns
 Bunker Hill at 
 New Philadelphia at 
 New Salem at 
 South Boston at 
(This list is based on USGS data and may include former settlements.)

Adjacent townships
 Gibson Township (north)
 Finley Township, Scott County (northeast)
 Polk Township (south)
 Pierce Township (southwest)
 Washington Township (west)

Cemeteries
The township contains these five cemeteries: Beech Grove, Blue River Church, Bunker Hill, Conway, olive branch and Chestnut Hill.

School districts
 East Washington School Corporation

Political districts
 Indiana's 9th congressional district
 State House District 73
 State Senate District 45

References
 United States Census Bureau 2007 TIGER/Line Shapefiles
 United States Board on Geographic Names (GNIS)
 IndianaMap

External links
 Indiana Township Association
 United Township Association of Indiana

Townships in Washington County, Indiana
Townships in Indiana